France Bleu Paris is a public radio station part of the French regional France Bleu network owned by Radio France, created on 2 January 2006. It currently broadcasts in the Île-de-France region, including Paris.

History
On 2 September 2002, the Parisian network France Bleu La CityRadio was created, covering the Paris area.

In January 2006 at 6 AM, the France Bleu networks of La CityRadio (Paris) combined with one of the oldest local stations of Radio France France Bleu Melun (before: Radio France Melun), with this fusion the station changing its name to becoming France Bleu Île-de-France

Since 31 August 2009, the station has aimed mainly at the latest information on the traffic in the Parisian area. The station changed its name again to France Bleu 107.1. The 107.1 could be interpreted as a reference to 107.7 MHz, a special FM frequency that highway commuters in France can tune in to for traffic information.

The station changed its name to France Bleu Paris in 2016.

Slogans
 2006 - 2008 : Vivre en bleu c'est mieux
 Since 2008 : Vu d'ici
 Since 2009 : N° 1 sur l'Info-Trafic en Région Parisienne

Frequencies

FM
 Paris, Île-de-France : 107.1 MHz; power : 10 kW
 Chartres : 97.3 MHz; power : 4 kW
 Fontainebleau : 103.3; power : 0.2 kW
 Melun : 92.7 MHz; power : 0.3 kW
 Nemours : 101.4 MHz; power : 0.2 kW
 Provins : 92.7 MHz; power : 0.2 kW

See also
 France Bleu
 Radio France

External links

Radio France Website

References

Radio stations in France
Radio stations established in 2006
Radio France